The 1966 Volta a Catalunya was the 46th edition of the Volta a Catalunya cycle race and was held from 11 September to 18 September 1966. The race started in Sabadell and finished in Barcelona. The race was won by Arie den Hartog.

General classification

References

1966
Volta
1966 in Spanish road cycling
September 1966 sports events in Europe